Consumer Buyline may refer to:

Consumer Buyline, originally California Buyline, an American TV program later replaced by Fight Back! with David Horowitz
Consumers' Buyline Inc. (CBI), a marketing company that was shut down in 1996 after investigation by 25 U.S. states